Nicola Bulgari (born 1941) is an Italian billionaire businessman and grandson of Sotirios Bulgari, founder of the luxury brand Bulgari.

Early life and education
Nicola Bulgari was born in Rome in 1941, the third son of Giorgio Bulgari (1890–1966). His brother Gianni was born in 1935 and Paolo in 1937.

Career
He has been vice chairman of Bulgari since 1984.

In 2013, after allegations of tax evasion, the Guardia di Finanza (tax police), raided the Bulgari office in Rome's Via Condotti, as part of a Euro 46 million seizure of assets. In May 2015, Paolo and Nicola Bulgari and 11 others were ordered by an Italian judge to stand trial on charges of tax evasion. Both deny the charges.

In January 2017, Forbes estimated the net worth of Nicola Bulgari at US$1.31 billion.

He received the America Award from the Italy–USA Foundation in 2015.

Personal life
Bulgari has four children and lives in Rome. His first wife was Anna, and they were married in 1963, until at least 1994. His second wife Beatrice Bulgari (nee Bordoni)
 is a costume designer, responsible for the costumes for the film Cinema Paradiso.

He collects vintage cars, especially American marques, in both Allentown, Pennsylvania, and Rome. His 21-acre facility in Allentown houses 125 cars in seven warehouses. He has 85 or more cars in Rome, including the faster models, and flies them to Allentown when they need repairs. His favourite marque is Buick and he has many from 1940 and 1941, coincidentally the year he was born.

References

Living people
1941 births
Businesspeople from Rome
Businesspeople from Allentown, Pennsylvania
Nicola
Italian businesspeople in fashion
Italian billionaires
Italian people of Greek descent
Italian people of Aromanian descent
Car collectors